is a passenger railway station  located in the city of  Takarazuka Hyōgo Prefecture, Japan. It is operated by the private transportation company Hankyu Railway.

Lines

Station layout
The station two elevated side platforms, with the station building underneath.

Platforms

Adjacent stations

History

Passenger statistics
In fiscal 2019, the station was used by an average of 11,994 passengers daily

Surrounding area
Nakayama-dera
Nakayamadera Station (JR West)

See also
List of railway stations in Japan

References

External links 

  Nakayama-kannon Station official home page 

Railway stations in Hyōgo Prefecture
Hankyu Railway Takarazuka Line
Stations of Hankyu Railway
Railway stations in Japan opened in 1910
Takarazuka, Hyōgo